Rubin is a Serbian alcoholic beverages company headquartered in Kruševac.

History

Rubin was established in 1955. Located in the wine region of West Morava, it produces chiefly grapes, wine and alcoholic drinks. Its most renowned product is Rubinov Vinjak, type of brandy. In 2005, Rubin was purchased for 30 million euros by "Invej", Serbian company owned by controversial businessman Predrag Ranković Peconi.

Market data
As of 21 February 2018, Rubin has a market capitalization of 32.79 million euros.

References

External links
 

1955 establishments in Serbia
Companies based in Kruševac
Drink companies of Serbia
Food and drink companies established in 1955
Serbian brands
Wineries of Serbia